James Michael Hallybone (born 15 March 1962) is an English former professional footballer who played in the Football League as a midfielder.

References

1962 births
Living people
People from Leytonstone
English footballers
Association football midfielders
Leyton Orient F.C. players
Halifax Town A.F.C. players
Dagenham F.C. players
Dartford F.C. players
English Football League players
National League (English football) players